Big Bang (also known as Big Bang First Single) is the debut single album by South Korean boy band Big Bang, released via YG Entertainment on August 28, 2006. It spawned the single "We Belong Together" featuring labelmate Park Bom, who would later debut as a member of 2NE1. Commercially, the single album peaked at number five on the monthly MIAK album charts in South Korea and sold nearly 44,000 copies by 2016.

Composition
G-Dragon and T.O.P composed several of the tracks on the single album; band leader G-Dragon composed the title track "We Belong Together" while he along with T.O.P. wrote the lyrics. The song is an R&B track that presents a rhythmic up-tempo tune with rap passages. The song "This Love" is a remake of the song of the same name by Maroon 5.

Commercial performance
Upon its release, Big Bang First Single debuted and peaked at number five on the monthly MIAK album chart issue for August 2006, selling 17,159 copies within three days. In the following month, it dropped to number 16 and sold an additional 9,452 copies. On the 2006 year-end album chart ranking, Big Bang First Single sold 36,420 copies and was the 35th best-selling album of the year in South Korea. Total sales grew to almost 40,000 copies by February 2007.

Track listing

Charts and sales

Monthly charts

Yearly charts

Sales

References

External links
Big Bang Official Site

BigBang (South Korean band) albums
2006 albums
YG Entertainment albums
Korean-language albums
Single albums
Albums produced by G-Dragon
2006 debut EPs